Kanna is a 2007 Tamil-language drama film by Anand starring Raja and Sheela.

Plot
The story takes place in Coimbatore, where Annapoorani, the daughter of Raghunath, a managing director of a company, has everything in life; loving family and friends and, studies in year 10 in a Catholic secondary school. She goes on a school organised educational tour to Ooty with her class mates and is accompanied by her class teacher Aashirvaatham and her biology teacher.

Whilst they were staying in a bungalow in Ooty, Poorani meets Kannaa, a florist by profession. Kannaa is introduced as Eric to the tourist group and agrees to be the group's tour guide on the request of the bungalow's caretaker. Since meeting, both Poorani and Kannaa are at loggerheads. Though Kannaa enjoys teasing her in a friendly manner knowing Poorani's wariness, Poorani seems to think that he has bad intentions. Eventually, her animosity towards him vanishes and she begins to develop an interest in him.

When Annapoorani returns to Coimbatore, she is unable to forget Kannaa and longs to be with him. One day when her friend tells her of how she is planning to meet her boyfriend in person, Poorani becomes influenced and decided to meet Kannaa in person with a gift in hand. She borrows a Scooter and leaves to Ooty. On the way, the bike breaks down, so she continues her journey on foot. In the meantime at home, her parents panic when they find that she has not returned from school and begin searching for her everywhere.

The rest of the movie depicts the learnings of Annapoorani, who is at the cusp of becoming an adult, on life and responsibilities.

Cast
Raja as Eric aka. Kannaa
Sheela as Annapoorani aka. Poorani
Prakash Raj as Raghunath, Annapoorani's father
Seetha as Annapoorani's mother
Livingston as Aashirvaatham Sir, Annapoorani's class teacher
Sona Nair as Teacher
Crane Manohar as Bus driver

Soundtrack
Soundtrack was composed by Ranjit Barot.
"Kuyil Paadum" - Shreya Ghoshal
"Ragasiya Kanna" - Sujatha
"Thullum" - Balaraman, Mahalakshmi Iyer
"Sembaruthi" - Manikka Vinayagam, Mukesh Mohamed, Vinaya
"Aayiram Kelvigal" - Hariharan
"Azhagiya Penne" - Karthik

Reception
Indiaglitz wrote "Debutant director Anand has to be appreciated for choosing a poignant story without restoring to gimmicks." Behindwoods wrote "Kanna on the whole, is a well made product. The director must be appreciated for what he has brought out on screen." Sify wrote "Director Anand has come out with a sweet movie with a nice message that shows how an adolescent mind due to immaturity falls to infatuation. However the trouble with the film is that it moves at snail pace, and is made like a mushy television serial." Rediff said "movie that tries very hard to be subtle and sensuous, exhibiting the Art of Love but instead falls flat on its face."

References

Films shot in Ooty
2007 films
2000s Tamil-language films
Films scored by Ranjit Barot
Indian coming-of-age films
2007 directorial debut films